The Examination for Architects in Canada, or ExAC, is a professional licensure examination for architects in most of Canada. It has been adopted by all of the Canadian Licensing Authorities. It is an alternative to the Architect Registration Examination maintained by the National Council of Architectural Registration Boards (NCARB).

The governing body for the ExAC is the Pan-Canadian ExAC Committee.

The first examination was held on November 17 & 18, 2008.

Sections

The contents of each of the ExAC sections are as follows:

ExAC Section 1
 Programming
 Site and Environmental Analysis
 Cost Management
 Coordinating Engineering Systems
 Schematic Design
 Design Development

ExAc Section 2
 National Building Code 2010 Edition

ExAC Section 3
 Final Project

ExAC Section 4
 Bidding and Contract Negotiations
 Construction Phase - Office
 Construction Phase - Site
 Project Management

See also

 Architecture of Canada
 Society for the Study of Architecture in Canada
 Canadian Centre for Architecture

References

Sources
"Architecture in Canada" The Canadian Encyclopedia
Kalman, Harold D. A History of Canadian Architecture. Toronto: Oxford University Press, 1994.

External links
Examination for Architects in Canada website

Professional certification in architecture
Architecture in Canada